Şıxlı (also, Sıxlı, Shikhly, and Shykhly) is a village and municipality in the Agdash Rayon of Azerbaijan.  It has a population of 669.

References 

Populated places in Agdash District